Dallas C. Sams (August 30, 1952 – March 5, 2007) was an American politician and farmer.

From Staples, Minnesota, Sams graduated from University of Minnesota with a degree in agriculture education. He was a farmer and farm business management instructor. From 1991 to 2006, he served in the Minnesota State Senate as a member of the Minnesota Democratic-Farmer-Labor Party. He died in St. Paul, Minnesota from brain cancer.

Notes

1952 births
2007 deaths
People from Staples, Minnesota
University of Minnesota College of Food, Agricultural and Natural Resource Sciences alumni
Democratic Party Minnesota state senators
20th-century American politicians
21st-century American politicians
Deaths from brain cancer in the United States
Deaths from cancer in Minnesota